Harry Bradshaw (17 April 1868 – 31 December 1910) was an English rugby union, and professional rugby league footballer who played in the 1890s. He played representative level rugby union (RU) for England and Yorkshire, and at club level for Bramley, as a forward, e.g. front row, lock, or back row, and club level rugby league (RL) for Leeds, as a forward (prior to the specialist positions of), during the era of contested scrums. Prior to Tuesday 2 June 1896, Bramley was a rugby union club.

Background
Harry Bradshaw was born in Bramley, West Riding of Yorkshire, England, he died aged 42 in Halifax, West Riding of Yorkshire, England.

Playing career

International honours
Harry Bradshaw won caps for England (RU) while at Bramley in 1892 against Scotland, in 1893 against Wales, Ireland, and Scotland, and in 1894 against Wales, Ireland, and Scotland.

In the early years of rugby football the goal was to score goals, and a try had zero value, but it provided the opportunity to try at goal, and convert the try to a goal with an unopposed kick at the goal posts. The point values of both the try and goal have varied over time, and in the early years footballers could "score" a try, without scoring any points.

Change of Code
When Bramley converted from the rugby union code to the rugby league code on Tuesday 2 June 1896, Harry Bradshaw would have been 28 years of age. Consequently, he was both a rugby union and rugby league footballer.

Contemporaneous Quote
The first game of the 1894 Home Nations Championship for Wales was against England, and they suffered a heavy defeat, losing 24-3. In an after match interview Wales' winger Norman Biggs was asked why he had failed to tackle England's forward Harry Bradshaw, who scored the first try; Biggs responded "Tackle him? It was as much as I could do to get out of his way!".

Note
ESPN states Harry Bradshaw's date of birth as being 17 April 1868, and date of death as being 31 December 1910, making him 42 at the time of his death. Whereas FreeBMD quotes Harry Bradshaw's age at death as being 41.

References

External links
Search for "Bradshaw" at rugbyleagueproject.org
Search for "Harry Bradshaw" at britishnewspaperarchive.co.uk

1868 births
1910 deaths
Bramley RLFC players
England international rugby union players
English rugby league players
English rugby union players
Leeds Rhinos players
People from Bramley, Leeds
Rugby league forwards
Rugby league players from Leeds
Rugby union forwards
Rugby union players from Leeds
Yorkshire County RFU players